The 2020 Camellia Bowl was a college football bowl game played on December 25, 2020, at the Cramton Bowl in Montgomery, Alabama, with kickoff at 2:30 p.m. EST on ESPN. It was the seventh edition of the Camellia Bowl, and was one of the 2020–21 bowl games concluding the 2020 FBS football season. Buffalo defeated Marshall, 17–10, to claim their second bowl victory in school history.

This was first bowl game played on Christmas Day since the 2003 Hawaii Bowl. Christmas Day college football had previously been played at the Cramton Bowl from 1979 to 2001 in the form of the Blue-Gray Football Classic. It was one of two bowl games, along with the inaugural Montgomery Bowl, that were played at the Cramton Bowl following the 2020 college football season.

Teams
The Camellia Bowl was contested by the Buffalo Bulls, from the Mid-American Conference (MAC), and the Marshall Thundering Herd, from Conference USA (C-USA). The programs had previously met nine times, with Marshall leading the series, 8–1; their most recent meeting had been a 48–14 win by Marshall in 2004. This was the programs' first meeting in a bowl game, and the first Camellia Bowl for both teams.

Buffalo

Buffalo of the MAC accepted their bowl bid on December 20, 2020. The Bulls entered the bowl with an overall record of 5–1 (5–0 in conference play). They won the MAC East division and competed in the MAC Championship Game, where they lost to Ball State.

Marshall

Marshall from C-USA accepted their bowl bid on December 20, 2020. The Thundering Herd entered the bowl with an overall record of 7–2 (4–1 in conference play); they were ranked at number 15 in the AP Poll at the end of November.

Game summary

Statistics

See also
 2020 Montgomery Bowl, held at the same venue

References

External links
 Game statistics at statbroadcast.com

Camellia Bowl
Camellia Bowl
Buffalo Bulls football bowl games
Marshall Thundering Herd football bowl games
Camellia Bowl
Camellia Bowl